Opera with divine powers is a form of Chinese opera played at religious ceremonies including for the gods' birthday, temple opening, at miaohui, ghost festival, Daijiao and traditional festivals, is the play performed to welcome the gods' race, is one of a series of celebrations held by the people to thank the gods and reward them for their blessings. Usually performed at temple fairs or theatres.

In an opera with divine powers, the opera players sacrifice extensively to a particular god. On stage, they will dress up as gods and goddesses and portray well-known Chinese mythological stories through song, dance and acrobatics. The opera is usually performed in a breakable large tent next to the temple(s).

This opera genre is very big in the Cantonese opera and several performances can be seen every year. The god of Cantonese opera is Huaguangdadi, who is worshiped by all Cantonese opera players.

Categories 
There are several types of performances, such as temple fair performances, festival performances, ancestral hall performances, festive performances, affairs performances, and peace plays. The most common is the Miaohui play, which is usually performed at Jade Emperor, Three Great Emperor-Officials, Guan Di, Xuanwu, Lü Dongbin], Mazu, Dragon King, City God, Land God, and other deities are performed on their birthdays. The worship of these gods is usually a major event for the local temples, and at the same time, the local temples also hold Temple Festival to celebrate during the festival.

The performance is mainly for the purpose of entertaining the gods or thanking them, and is only performed incidentally for the appreciation of the good faith. Therefore, the stage is often set up at the front of the temple, and the audience is not allowed to go forward or get too close, but can only watch the show from the sides or the back, so that the gods can be said to be sitting in the VIP seats or the seats in the front rows.

In Hong Kong, most of the performances are Cantonese opera, Teochew opera and Liyuan opera.In Taiwan, in the early days, it was Beiguan music, Gaojia opera, Taiwanese opera and Glove puppetry, but after the restoration, it was mostly Taiwanese opera and Glove puppetry, and even Puppetry and modern Drama are available, and in recent decades, Film has also been shown to honor the gods. In mainland China, the performance of Shinto plays is based on the region's popular theater genres. In Southeast Asia, most of the Chinese operas are Taiwanese opera, Teochew opera, and Cantonese opera.

Development 
During the Northern Song Dynasty, temple plays were widely held in the lower reaches of the Yangtze River as "puppet plays", and when they were staged, the audience was "full of laughter and talk, and the villagers gathered to watch and drink wine, and were drunk and beaten". The custom of social drama has been passed down for many years, and the celebration of social drama is very rich, as seen in "The Day of the Society" written by the Tang Dynasty poet Wang Kai, and "Spring Society (and)" written by the Song Dynasty poet Lu You.

The famous literary figure Lu Xun wrote a novel "The Social Opera".

References 

Cantonese opera
Chinese opera
Chinese culture